The Straits Settlement and Johore Territorial Waters Agreement of 1927 was signed between the United Kingdom as the colonial ruler of the Straits Settlements of which Singapore was part, and the Sultanate of Johor which at that time was a nominally sovereign state, to determine the border between the island of Singapore and Johor along the Straits of Johor. Both Malaysia, of which Johor is a component state, and Singapore are successor states to the agreement. The treaty forms the basis of the current border agreement between Malaysia and Singapore which was signed in 1995.

The agreement was signed in Singapore on 19 October 1927 between Sir Hugh Charles Clifford, then Governor of the Straits Settlements, and Sultan Ibrahim of Johor.

See also
Malaysia-Singapore Border

References

Treaties of Malaysia
Treaties of Singapore
Treaties of the United Kingdom
Boundary treaties
Malaysia–Singapore border
Treaties concluded in 1927
British rule in Malaysian history
1927 in the Straits Settlements
Treaties extended to the Straits Settlements